Josef Hildebrand (28 June 1855 – 16 March 1935) was a Swiss politician and President of the Swiss Council of States (1898/1899).

Further reading

External links 
 
 

1855 births
1935 deaths
Members of the Council of States (Switzerland)
Presidents of the Council of States (Switzerland)